Maung Maung San (born 29 December 1946), also known by his pen names Kyi Min and Kyaw Saw Min, is a Burmese writer and a former veterinary physician. He has served as Rector and Pro-rector of the University of Veterinary Science, Yezin. He is a former senior member of Myanmar Press Council.

Biography
Maung Maung San was born on 29 December 1946 in Pathein, Ayeyarwady Division, Myanmar. He started studying veterinary science in 1968. He graduated with B.V.S from the Yezin Institute of Veterinary Science and M.V.Sc from the University of Queensland. He wrote many books under his pen names Kyi Min and later Kyaw Saw Min. 

His book Phat Kyi won the Sayarwon Tin Shwe Literature Award in 2017. He has published over 40 books during his career.

Personal life
He married Khin Ma Ma, a veterinary physician who served as Pro-Rector of the University of Veterinary Science, Yezin. His daughter Khin Hnin Kyi Thar is a prominent philanthropist, journalist and writer.

Works
Over 40 books including:
ပညာခရီးနှင့် ပညာမျက်စိ (2009)
သမိုင်း သို့မဟုတ် ခေတ်ရုပ်ပုံကား
ဒေါ်စုသို့ပေးစာ
ရှင်းတူးရှင်တူး (2015)
ဦးအောင်သင်းနှင့် ကျွန်တော် (2016)
Phat Kyi (ဖတ်ကြည့်, Read it) (2017)

References 

Living people
1946 births
Burmese journalists
Burmese writers
People from Ayeyarwady Region